The Horsham Saints Football Netball Club is an Australian rules football and netball club based in the city of Horsham, Victoria. The football team competes in the Wimmera Football League (WFL).

History
The Horsham Saints, formed in 1945, was known as YCW and joined the Horsham & District Football League (HDFL). In 1947 the club changed its name to St. Michael's. The club won five premierships in the HDFL.

In 1993, the club moved to the Wimmera Football League. In 2000, the club adopted its current name.

In 2012, Tom Sosthiem joined the Horsham Saints Football club.

Bibliography 
 Wheatbelt Warriors. A Tribute To Wimmera Football League

References

External links
 Facebook page

Australian rules football clubs established in 1945
Sports clubs established in 1945
Wimmera Football League clubs
1945 establishments in Australia
Netball teams in Victoria (Australia)